Peace park is another name for a transboundary protected area

Peace Park may also refer to:
ANZAC Peace Park, Australia
Canberra Peace Park, Australia
Hiroshima Peace Memorial Park, a park in Hiroshima, Japan dedicated to the legacy of Hiroshima as the first city in the world to be nuclear bombed
Island of Ireland Peace Park, a park in Messines, Belgium
 Miyazaki Peace Park
Nagasaki Peace Park
Oxford Falls Peace Park
Peace Park (Missouri), in Columbia, Missouri at the University of Missouri
Peace Park (Montréal) (Place de la Paix), a public place in Montreal, Canada
Peace Park (Seattle), a park in Seattle, Washington, United States
Santiphap Park, Bangkok, also known as Peace Park
Waterton-Glacier International Peace Park

See also

 Peace Garden (disambiguation)